Morskoy is a rural locality (a khutor) in Pyatiizbyanskoye Rural Settlement, Kalachyovsky District, Volgograd Oblast, Russia. The population was 46 as of 2010.

Geography 
Morskoy is located 32 km southwest of Kalach-na-Donu (the district's administrative centre) by road. Pyatiizbyansky is the nearest rural locality.

References 

Rural localities in Kalachyovsky District